John Kearney was a member of Clann na Gael and captured during what was called the Fenian dynamite campaign (1881 to 1885).

Background
After the failure of the rebellion of 1867 and of the raids on Canada in 1866 and 1870, many American Fenians were disillusioned about any campaign to counter the British presence in Ireland.

However, Alfred Nobel's 1866 invention of Dynamite, appeared to some members as the remedy for the ailing 'physical-force' movement. With combined with the new innovation of clockwork timers, members of the Irish Republican Brotherhood (IRB), and Clann na Gael started the Fenian dynamite campaign (1881–85), which sustained a campaign incorporating a series of explosions in British urban centres.

Through the use of explosives and timers (modern technology at the time), the Irish question affected daily life in British cities for the first time.

A dynamite school
A dynamite school in Brooklyn, America trained men in the do-it-yourself use of explosives, and then dispatched them to Britain to undertake attacks in British cities.

The sophistication of their bomb design was the work of a chemicals expert who called himself Professor Mezzeroff. He was hired by Jeremiah O’Donovan Rossa to bring expertise and credibility to the United Irishmen.

John Kearney
By the early 1880s at least four of students of the School were in operation in Ireland, Scotland and England, the most remarkable being Timothy Featherstone, John Francis Kearney, Henry Dalton and Thomas J. Mooney.

Kearney, a student of Mezzeroff, was a key element of the Jeremiah O'Donovan Rossa backed group that exploded three bombs in Glasgow in January 1883, at a gasworks, a railway station and a canal bridge. Ten men were arrested and imprisoned for their roles in the conspiracy. Kearney walked free, having turned queen's evidence after his arrest.

See also
 List of Irish uprisings
 Fenian Rising
 Fenian raids
 Manchester Martyrs and Cuba Five
 S-Plan - a bombing campaign in England by the Irish Republican Army
 Physical force Irish republicanism
 Vivian Dering Majendie one of the first bomb disposal experts

Further reading

References and notes
 The Fenian Dynamite campaign 1881-85.
 ‘Scientific warfare or the quickest way to liberate Ireland’: the Brooklyn Dynamite School.
 The curious case of Professor Mezzeroff – IED expert, terrorism proponent and New York liquor salesman.

1880s in England
1880s in Ireland
Irish Republican Brotherhood